John Carter is a Seventh-day Adventist Christian evangelist known especially for his work in the former Soviet Union. His presentation is known as the "Carter Report", and he is a somewhat known figure within the Adventist church. He is married to Beverley L. Carter.

Biography 
John Carter was born in Australia. His first mission was in Albury, NSW around 1976 after a local TV advertising campaign that saw some 1500 people attend at the Albury Civic Center. He ran a mission in Melbourne in 1980. In 1989, the Carter Report television studio in Newbury Park, California was dedicated.

Work in Communist Countries 
A 1990 crusade was attended by thousands of people. In 1991 a small mission was held in Moscow, the capital of the formerly Communist country of Russia. 100 people were baptized and joined the church. In 1992, 2500 were baptized in an outreach in the city of Nizhny Novgorod. Meetings there in the following year brought in 1200 people to the Adventist church. Another series in 1994 saw 8000 conversions to Christianity. Later, 1300 joined the Adventist church through his work. In 1995, he ran meetings in Ukraine's capital Kyiv. 52,000 attended, and 2819 joined the Adventist church. There were city officials that harassed attenders at that evangelistic meeting.

Other Outreach Work 

A Los Angeles, California campaign in 1999 saw 100 people join the church. In 1998, the former First Secretary of the local Communist Party of the Nizhny Novgorod was converted through Carter's ministry. Another series in Ukraine in 2001 was attended by 25,000 at its opening.

The Carter Report 
In 1996, the Carter Report won two Silver Angel Awards from Excellence In Media. The Tenth Carter Report occurred in 2002.

See also 
 Media ministries of the Seventh-day Adventist Church

References 
 John Carter: The Authorised Biography by Phil Ward (Victoria, Australia: Signs, 2006);

External links 
 The Carter Report official website
 Articles by Carter, about Carter, and about the Carter Report as cataloged in the Seventh-day Adventist Periodical Index (SDAPI)

Year of birth missing (living people)
Living people
Evangelists
Seventh-day Adventist ministers
History of the Seventh-day Adventist Church
Australian Seventh-day Adventists
Seventh-day Adventist missionaries in Russia
Seventh-day Adventist missionaries in Ukraine